Josef "Josl" Rieder (3 December 1932 – 15 June 2019) was an Austrian alpine skier. He competed at the 1956 Winter Olympics in Cortina d'Ampezzo, but was disqualified in the downhill event and failed to finish the slalom. He lit the Olympic Flame at the 1964 Winter Olympics in Innsbruck. At the FIS Alpine World Ski Championships 1958, he won three medals with a gold in slalom and silvers in the giant slalom and combination events.

References

External links

1932 births
2019 deaths
Alpine skiers at the 1956 Winter Olympics
Austrian male alpine skiers
Olympic alpine skiers of Austria
Olympic cauldron lighters
20th-century Austrian people